Ophionyssus is a genus of bird mites in the family Macronyssidae. There are about seven described species in Ophionyssus.

Species
These seven species belong to the genus Ophionyssus:
 Ophionyssus galeotes Domrow, Heath & Kennedy, 1980
 Ophionyssus javanensis Mich. & Lukoschus
 Ophionyssus lacertinus (Berlese, 1892)
 Ophionyssus natricis (Gervais, 1844)
 Ophionyssus saurarum (Oudemans, 1901)
 Ophionyssus schreibericolus
 Ophionyssus scincorum Domrow, Heath & Kennedy, 1980

References

Mesostigmata
Articles created by Qbugbot